The Old Village Historic District is predominantly residential historic district encompassing the old village center of Chatham, Massachusetts.  The Old Village occupies the southeast corner of the town where it is framed by Main Street and Holway Street (north), Bridge Street and Bearse's Lane (south), Chatham Harbor (east) and Mill Pond and Little Mill Pond (west).  The houses of the district represent a cross section of architectural development in the town, with houses dating from c. 1730 to the 20th century.  The district also includes the Chatham Light, a church, and a small number of commercial buildings.

The district was listed on the National Register of Historic Places in 2001.

See also
National Register of Historic Places listings in Barnstable County, Massachusetts

References

Historic districts in Barnstable County, Massachusetts
Chatham, Massachusetts
National Register of Historic Places in Barnstable County, Massachusetts
Historic districts on the National Register of Historic Places in Massachusetts